A Man Needs a Maid may refer to:

 "A Man Needs a Maid (song)", a song from the Neil Young album Harvest
 "A Man Needs a Maid", an episode of The Naked Brothers Band; see List of The Naked Brothers Band episodes